Russell Cox is an Australian former rugby league footballer who played in the 1960s and 1970s.

Career
Cox was graded with St. George in 1968 from the Renown United junior rugby league club. 

After playing in the Third Grade grand final in 1971, he was retained as a reserve for the first grade 1971 Grand Final, in which he replaced an injured Grahame Bowen during the second half. Russell Cox was a nuggety Hooker/Front Row forward, who played 62 first grade games with Saints, in which he was also included as a non playing reserve in the 1975 Grand Final. Cox was reserve in both the 1977 grand final and the replay against Parramatta.   

He left Sydney football at the end of the 1977 season to join Waratah-Mayfield in the Newcastle competition as captain/coach, and from that club he represented N.S.W. Country Firsts in 1978. He is the brother of the former St. George and Newtown player, Barry Cox.

References

St. George Dragons players
Australian rugby league players
Living people
1951 births
Rugby league hookers
Rugby league props
Date of birth missing (living people)
Place of birth missing (living people)